The 1997 Big South Conference baseball tournament  was the postseason baseball tournament for the Big South Conference, held from May 16 through 18 at Knights Stadium in Fort Mill, South Carolina.  The top four finishers from the regular season participated in the double-elimination tournament. The champion, won the title for the first time and earned an invitation to the 1997 NCAA Division I baseball tournament.

Format
The top four finishers from the regular season qualified for the tournament.  The teams were seeded one through four and played a double-elimination tournament.

Bracket and results

All-Tournament Team

Most Valuable Player
Jason Parsons was named Tournament Most Valuable Player.  Parsons was a pitcher for UNC Greensboro.

References

Tournament
Big South Conference Baseball Tournament
Big South baseball tournament
Big South Conference baseball tournament